Interspecies may refer to:
 Interspecific, something occurring between species
 Interspecific competition
 Interspecies communication
 Interspecies friendship
 Interspecies family
 Interspecies quorum sensing
 Interspecies sex
 Interspecies erotica
 Interspecies breeding
 Interspecific pregnancy
 An organization founded by Jim Nollman